Gorochoviidae is an extinct family of rock crawlers in the order Grylloblattodea. There are at least three genera and about eight described species in Gorochoviidae.

Genera
These three genera belong to the family Gorochoviidae:
 † Gorochovia Storozhenko, 1994
 † Gorochoviella Storozhenko, 1994
 † Pseudoliomopterites Storozhenko, 1994

References

Grylloblattodea
Prehistoric insect families